The 1983–84 Polska Liga Hokejowa season was the 49th season of the Polska Liga Hokejowa, the top level of ice hockey in Poland. 10 teams participated in the league, and Polonia Bytom won the championship.

Final round

Qualification round

Playoffs

Quarterfinals 
 Polonia Bytom - Unia Oświęcim 2:0 (11:0, 6:1)
 Naprzód Janów - GKS Tychy 1:2 (5:1, 2:5, 3:4)
 Zagłębie Sosnowiec - GKS Katowice 2:0 (6:1, 4:3)
 Podhale Nowy Targ - ŁKS Łódź 2:1 (14:2, 0:3, 16:2)

Semifinals 
 Polonia Bytom - GKS Tychy 2:0 (9:2, 7:1)
 Zagłębie Sosnowiec - Podhale Nowy Targ 2:1 (4:8, 7:3, 5:4)

Final
 Polonia Bytom - Zagłębie Sosnowiec 2:1 (2:1, 2:3, 7:0)

Placing round

7th place
 ŁKS Łódź - Unia Oświęcim 2:1 (2:6, 7:3, 7:1)

5th place 
 Naprzód Janów - GKS Katowice 2:1 (9:6, 4:6, 5:2)

3rd place 
 Podhale Nowy Targ - GKS Tychy 2:0 (5:0, 4:2)

Relegation 
 KS Cracovia - BTH Bydgoszcz 2:0 (5:4, 10:4)

External links
 Season on hockeyarchives.info

Polska
Polska Hokej Liga seasons
Liga